The Men's 25 km competition of the 2022 European Aquatics Championships were held on 20 August.

Swimmers were halted partway through the competition due to extreme weather and the event canceled. Approximately three months later, LEN awarded the medals and final rankings.

Results
The race was started at 13:00.

References

2022 European Aquatics Championships